Saint-Mathieu-de-Rioux is a municipality in the Canadian province of Quebec, located in the Les Basques Regional County Municipality.

Demographics

Population

Language

See also
 List of municipalities in Quebec

References

External links

  Saint-Mathieu-de-Rioux

Municipalities in Quebec
Incorporated places in Bas-Saint-Laurent